Sob Sisters is a British television sitcom which aired on ITV in 1989. Following the death of a husband, two sisters move in together despite their strongly contrasting personalities.

Other actors who appeared in episodes of the series include Mark Kingston, Maxine Audley, Jeillo Edwards, Jennifer Croxton, Sue Holderness and Tim Barrett.

Main cast
 Gwen Taylor as  Liz
 Polly Adams as  Dorothy
 Freddie Jones as  Leo
 Philip Bird as  Charlie
 Beryl Cooke as Edna

Episodes

References

Bibliography

External links
 
 

1989 British television series debuts
1989 British television series endings
1980s British sitcoms
ITV sitcoms
Television series by ITV Studios
English-language television shows
Television shows produced by Central Independent Television
Television shows set in England